The Caledonian Railway Bridge is a bridge crossing the River Clyde at Broomielaw in Scotland. It is adjacent to Glasgow Central station.

First bridge

The first bridge was built between 1876–1878 for the Caledonian Railway Company, and opened on 1 August 1879 It was engineered by Blyth and Cunningham and built by Sir William Arrol & Co. It consisted of wrought iron lattice girders linked at the top by a light arched lattice girder, and carried on a cast iron arch (visible in the photograph) over twin piers in the river. The piers are formed of cast iron cylinders sunk to bedrock and filled with concrete, and then extended above the river with Dalbeattie granite.

The bridge carried four tracks into the new Glasgow Central station.

In 1966–1967, the girders and tracks were removed, leaving the pillars in the water, after resignalling meant it was no longer needed.

Second bridge

The current, second bridge was built in 1899–1905 during the expansion of Central Station, to a design by D. A. Matheson, chief engineer of the Caledonian Railway,  Arrol and Co. was the contractor for this bridge as well. 

There are a minimum of eight parallel main girders in the width.

It leads immediately into Glasgow Central Station on the north bank of the river. At the time of its opening, it was believed to be the widest railway bridge in existence.

References

External links

Bridges in Glasgow
Bridges across the River Clyde
Railway bridges in Scotland
Gorbals
Bridges completed in 1905
1905 establishments in Scotland